Immanuel Shidute Heita (born 20 April 1992) is a Namibian footballer who plays as a midfielder for Black Africa and the Namibia national football team.

References

1992 births
Living people
Footballers from Windhoek
Association football midfielders
Ramblers F.C. players
Black Africa S.C. players
Namibia international footballers
Namibia Premier League players
Namibia A' international footballers
2020 African Nations Championship players
Namibian men's footballers